Upper deck may refer to:
 Upper Deck Company, an American trading card business
 Upper deck, the highest level internal deck on a ship
 The second (or higher) tier (deck) of seating in a sports stadium